Salem Airpark or Salem Air Park  is a public use airport in Mahoning County, Ohio, United States. It is located three nautical miles (6 km) north of the central business district of Salem, Ohio.

Facilities and aircraft 
It has two runways: 10L/28R is 3,404 by 50 feet (1,038 x 15 m) with an asphalt pavement and 10R/28L is 2,593 by 85 feet (790 x 26 m) with a turf surface.

For the 12-month period ending July 9, 2008, the airport had 16,920 aircraft operations, an average of 46 per day: 95% general aviation, 5% air taxi, and <1% military. At that time there were 78 aircraft based at this airport: 90% single-engine and 10% multi-engine.

See also
Lansdowne Airport
Youngstown Elser Metro Airport
Youngstown Executive Airport
Youngstown-Warren Regional Airport

References

External links 
 Aerial image as of 20 April 1994 from USGS The National Map via MSR Maps
 
 

Airports in Ohio
Buildings and structures in Mahoning County, Ohio
Transportation in Mahoning County, Ohio